Nora Gjakova  (born 17 August 1992) is a Kosovan judoka. She received a gold medal after winning the women's 57-kg judo competition at the 2020 Summer Olympics in Tokyo, Japan. In August 2021, she was awarded the Honor of the Nation Decoration of Albania by the President of Albania.

Life and career
She won 2 Continental Opens in 2015, in Tunis and Lisbon. Coached by Driton Kuka, Gjakova meanwhile won 11 World Cup medals.

On 21 April 2016, she earned a bronze medal at the 2016 European Judo Championships in Kazan, Russia.

In 2021, she won one of the bronze medals in her event at the 2021 Judo World Masters held in Doha, Qatar. A few months later, she won the gold medal in women's 57 kg at the 2020 Summer Olympics in Tokyo.

Her brother Akil Gjakova is also a judoka.

References

External links
 
 
 

1992 births
Living people
Competitors at the 2018 Mediterranean Games
European Games medalists in judo
European Games bronze medalists for Kosovo
European Games silver medalists for Kosovo
Judoka at the 2015 European Games
Judoka at the 2016 Summer Olympics
Judoka at the 2019 European Games
Judoka at the 2020 Summer Olympics
Kosovan female judoka
Medalists at the 2020 Summer Olympics
Mediterranean Games gold medalists for Kosovo
Mediterranean Games medalists in judo
Olympic judoka of Kosovo
Olympic gold medalists for Kosovo
Olympic medalists in judo
Sportspeople from Gjakova